The Toyota HD is a series of Diesel engines produced by Toyota.

1HD-T
The 1HD-T is a 12 valve  straight-6 SOHC turbocharged diesel engine of direct injection design.

 Coaster, HDB20, January 1990 January 1993
 Coaster, HDB30, January 1990 January 1993
 Coaster, HDB50, January 1993 January 1995
 Land Cruiser, HDJ80, January 1990 January 1995

1HD-FT
The 1HD-FT’'' is a  straight-6 24 valve SOHC turbocharged diesel engine of direct injection design. Known as the "multivalve" it has 4 valves per cylinder (2 inlet, 2 exhaust), central vertically mounted injector, and no glow plugs but rather an intake glow screen heater (like the later electronic 1HD-FTE below). The 4 valves per cylinder are actuated by the SOHC, by using bridges so each rocker actuates a pair of valves.

 Land Cruiser, HDJ80, 1995
 Coaster, HDB50, July 1995 July 1999
 Land Cruiser, HDJ80, July 1995 July 1999
 Yanmar 6LP and Yamaha ME diesel engine (marinized version of 1HD-FT).

1HD-FTE
The 1HD-FTE''' is a  straight-6 24 valve turbocharged diesel engine. The fuel system is direct injection, and adopts the electronic fuel injection (EFI) system. Redline of this engine is at 4200 rpm.

The 4 valves per cylinder are actuated by the SOHC, by using bridges so each rocker actuates a pair of valves.

A lower output  non-intercooled version powers HDJ78 Troop Carrier and HDJ79 Utility versions.

Also some of the HDB50 and HDB51 Coasters are fitted with this 1HD-FTE engine.

References

External links

HD
Diesel engines by model
Straight-six engines